The Black Field is the third split album by PGR/Thessalonians, released in 1989 by Silent.

Reception
Factsheet Five awarded The Black Field five out of five stars and said described the music as "spare, almost minimal in much of its sound, with a "late night experimental radio" appeal" Option described the music as "not a noise fest, it is usually low key, sparse in a way, and nearly ambient" and the "ebb and flow of rumbling guitar feedback opens things up as zips and drips irregularly occur."

Track listing

Personnel
Adapted from The Black Field liner notes.

Thessalonians
 Kim Cascone – instruments, production
 David Gardner – instruments
 David James – instruments
 Kurt Robinson – instruments
 Larry Thrasher – instruments

Additional performers
 Gary Weisberg (as G. Richard Weisberg) – spoken word

Production and design
 Jorge Luis Borges – text
 Kathleen Cascone – typography
 Leonard Marcel – engineering

Release history

References

External links 
 The Black Field at Discogs (list of releases)

1989 live albums
Split albums
PGR (American band) albums
Thessalonians (band) albums
Adaptations of works by Jorge Luis Borges